The Volvo Kalmar plant was a production facility of Volvo Cars, just outside Kalmar, Sweden. Construction began in 1971 and it opened in 1974. The plant was one of the most revolutionary automotive production plants in the world at the time. Using Volvo Halifax Assembly and Volvo Torslanda Assembly as examples, the Kalmar plant also introduced the group assembly system.

At Kalmar production was carried out on 18 ft. battery-driven carriers, which held one single car body at a time. The carriers were designed to swivel and rotate the individual bodies so that workers could access every aspect of the car in a practical fashion. The best advantage with those carriers, was that they held car in best possible ergonomic position, and by that reduce the personnel's work related injuries. The carriers was not locked in as in a traditional assembly line, they were following wires embedded in the floor, and could by that move around more freely. By then the carriers could i.e. be parked in buffer zones, if there was disturbance due to missing parts.

The plant was closed in 1994.

Team Assembly System

The teams organized themselves any way they wished and at the speed they choose. While a worker on a conventional assembly line might spend his entire shift mounting one license-plate lamp after another, every member of a Kalmar work team may work at one time or another on all parts of the electrical system—from taillights to turn signals, head lamps, horn, fuse box and part of the electronically controlled fuel-injection system. The only requirement is that every team meet its production goal for a shift.
As long as cars roll out on schedule, workers are free to take coffee breaks when they please or to refresh themselves in comfortable lounges equipped with kitchens and saunas. The group assembly system operated in two ways, docked or in-line.

Docked assembly was carried out by teams of 2-3 that covered one aspect of the car on multiple vehicles or docked where teams of 3 built entire individual vehicles from the ground up. There were 25 production teams in total at Kalmar and every team had access to their own individual break room, workshop and sauna.

Models produced 
Volvo 164
Volvo 240
Volvo 260
Volvo 760
Volvo 740
Volvo 940
Volvo 960

References

Former motor vehicle assembly plants
Volvo Cars
Volvo factories
Motor vehicle assembly plants in Sweden
Buildings and structures in Kalmar County
1994 disestablishments in Sweden
1974 establishments in Sweden